Donella may refer to:
 Donella (brachiopod), a fossil genus of brachiopods in the family Pugnacidae
 Donella (plant), a genus of plants in the family Sapotaceae
 Donella is a forname
 Donella Meadows, American environmental scientist
 Donella is a surname
 Chad Donella, Canadian actor